The Chief of Naval Operations of the Republic of Korea Navy (Korean: ,) is the head of the Republic of Korea Navy (ROKN). The post was established following the induction of Joseon Coastal Guards (Korean: 조선해안경비대) into the Republic of Korea Armed Forces and the subsequent renaming of the organization as the Republic of Korea Navy in 1948. Originally held by a vice admiral, the post of CNO has been held by an admiral since 1968.

The appointment of the CNO, along with the Chiefs of Staff of the Army, Chiefs of Staff of the Air Force and the Chairman of the Joint Chiefs of Staff, is referred to the State Council of South Korea for deliberation according to Article 89, Constitution of South Korea.

List of the Chiefs of Naval Operations

References 

Republic of Korea Navy admirals
Korea, South